The women's 3000 metres steeplechase at the 2022 European Athletics Championships will take place at the Olympiastadion on 18 and 20 August.

Records

Schedule

Results

Heats
First 5 in each heat (Q) and the next 5 fastest (q) advance to the Final.

Final

References

3000 metres steeplechase W
Steeplechase at the European Athletics Championships
Euro